Ivan Andreyevich Cherenchikov (born 25 August 1984) is a Russian football coach and a former player. He is an assistant coach with FC Amkar Perm.

Career statistics

External links 
Profile on Official FC Amkar Website 

1984 births
People from Ozyorsk, Chelyabinsk Oblast
Living people
Russian footballers
Russia under-21 international footballers
Association football midfielders
Association football defenders
FC Amkar Perm players
Russian Premier League players
FC Baltika Kaliningrad players
Sportspeople from Chelyabinsk Oblast